The 2018 wildfire season in Nevada began in June 2018 and ended November 2018.

Wildfires included:
Martin Fire (July 4–August 2), the largest in state history with  burned
Boone Springs Fire (July 4–July 9)
South Sugarloaf Fire (August 17–September)
Upper Colony Fire (June 17–June 22)

References

 
Wildfires
Wildfires in Nevada